Bjerkandera is a genus of wood-rotting fungi in the family Meruliaceae.

Taxonomy
The genus was circumscribed by Finnish mycologist Petter Adolf Karsten in 1879. The type species, B. adusta, was originally described as Boletus adustus by Carl Ludwig Willdenow in 1787. The generic name honours Swedish naturalist Clas Bjerkander. Karsten included seven species in addition to the type: B. dichroa, B. amorpha, B. fumosa, B. kymatodes, B. diffusa, and B. isabellina. Most of those species have been since moved to different genera or synonymized.

In a 1913 survey of polypore genera, Adeline Ames included B. adusta, B. fumosa, and B. puberula; the latter fungus is now placed in Abortiporus. Marinus Anton Donk included only B. adusta and B. fumosa in a 1974 publication. Some authors have suggested to merge these two species into other genera, such as Gloeoporus, Tyromyces, or Grifola. Molecular phylogenetic analysis has demonstrated that the two traditional Bjerkandera fungi  form a monophyletic group that is sister to the crust fungus Terana coerulea. The little-known Cuban species B. subsimulans and B. terebrans, both originally described by Miles Berkeley and Moses Ashley Curtis, were transferred to Bjerkandera by William Alphonso Murrill in 1907, and are accepted as valid species by Index Fungorum. Bjerkandera atroalba and B. centroamericana are two neotropical species that were transferred to Bjerkandera, and described as new, respectively, in 2015.  In 2021 four new species were added from South America and Asia.

Description

The fruit bodies of Bjerkandera fungi have soft and pliable caps with an upper surface texture ranging from finely hairy to smooth. The pore surface on the undersurface of the cap ranges from grey to black or buff to greyish brown. The tubes are the same colour. A dark, denser zone is typically present between tubes and the context, which is usually white to buff.

The hyphal system in Bjerkandera is monomitic, containing only generative hyphae. These hyphae have clamps, and are thin to thick-walled. Cystidia are absent from the hymenium. The spores of Bjerkandera are smooth with a short cylindrical shape, thin-walled, and do not react in Melzer's reagent.

Habitat and distribution
Bjerkandera fungi usually  grow on hardwoods, and are rarely on conifers. They cause a white rot.

Species
Bjerkandera adusta (Willd.) P.Karst. (1879)
Bjerkandera atroalba (Rick) Westphalen & Tomšovský (2015)
Bjerkandera centroamericana Kout, Westphalen & Tomšovský (2015)
Bjerkandera ecuadorensis Y.C. Dai, Chao G. Wang & Vlasák (2021)
Bjerkandera fulgida Y.C. Dai & Chao G. Wang (2021)
Bjerkandera fumosa (Pers.) P.Karst. (1879)
Bjerkandera mikrofumosa Ryvarden (2016)
Bjerkandera minispora Y.C. Dai & Chao G. Wang (2021)
Bjerkandera resupinata Y.C. Dai & Chao G. Wang (2021)
Bjerkandera subsimulans Murrill (1907)
Bjerkandera terebrans (Berk. & M.A.Curtis) Murrill (1907)

References

Taxa described in 1879
Meruliaceae
Polyporales genera
Taxa named by Petter Adolf Karsten